Madfa al iftar, ar: مدفع الافطار, literally 'cannon for breaking the fast', is an ancient tradition that started in Egypt and spread to several surrounding Arab countries. Every day minutes before the Maghreb adhan, a cannon would fire a single shot to notify people the time of Iftar in Ramadan, when Muslims get to break their long day fasting as the sun sets.

Origin
Though the tradition is practiced today in most parts of the Arab world, the blast of the cannon was first used to inform the entire city of the time of Iftar, before the invention of clocks, TVs, or cellphones. The cannon is first fired to herald the beginning of the holy month of Ramadan, and then each day to announce the breaking of the fast at the sunset prayers of maghrib. Most historians agree the practice originated in Egypt, with some claiming it dates back as far as 10th century, when one of the Fatimid caliphs ordered a cannon be placed on Cairo's Muqatam Hill so all Muslims would hear the signal to break their fasts, although this is unlikely as cannons were not invented yet. Other historians trace the tradition to the Mamluk ruler Sayf ad-Din Khushqadam in the 15th century, but the most common account places the origin of the custom in the 19th century, during the reign of Ottoman ruler Muhammad Ali.

A popular story is that the practice originated during the of the Mamluk ruler, Khosh Qadam. It was said the Sultan was given a cannon and that his soldiers tested it by firing it one sunset. By coincidence, this happened at the end of the day's fasting in Ramadan. When the people of Cairo heard the boom they took it as sign they could end their fast, and were so thrilled with the idea that they thronged to the palace to congratulate the sultan. Seeing an opportunity to endear her father to the people, his daughter Hajja Fatimah urged him to fire the cannon every day for iftar. He agreed and the tradition of "midfa al iftar" was born, with the local nickname Hajja Fatimah. To this day, a cannon is placed on the plateau of Muqatam near the Citadel to announce iftar.

The practice has spread throughout the Arab world in the past century. It was adopted by the Saudi state following their conquest of the holy cities of Mecca and Medina in the 1920s, and introduced in Sharjah and Dubai in the mid-20th century. Various designs of Ramadan cannon are used, ranging from purpose-built blank-firing devices to conventional artillery guns, such as the British QF 25-pound howitzer used in Dubai. An American 75 mm M1916 howitzer, gifted to the local Muslim authorities by the British Army, is used in Jerusalem. In Cairo, a German Krupp 75 mm field gun is used. This is nicknamed "al-ḥājja Fāṭima", after Sayf ad-Din Khushqadam's wife.

Other countries
 - Several cannons are located in Saudi Arabia, especially in the Hejaz region cities such as Mecca, Jeddah and Medina.
 - the UAE has recently added two new locations in Dubai where tourists can go and watch the Cannons fire. The first cannon was fired in Sharjah in the 19th century by Sultan Bin Saqr al-Qasimi.
 - 3 cannons are located in Bahrain, Which are usually fired daily at the Riffa Fort (Video), Arad Fort and The Avenues, Bahrain.
 - The sound of the Iftar Cannon can be heard over the Capital Sana'a, though with the ongoing civil war it is not sure if this continued.

  - Cannons are placed at Souq Waqif, Katara, Muhammad Ibn Abdulwahhab Grand Mosque, and Souq Waqif Al Wakrah, under supervision of the Qatari Armed Forces.

References

Ramadan
Egyptian culture
Arab culture